Lower Peach Tree is an unincorporated community in Wilcox County, Alabama, United States.

The community was named for a peach tree which stood near the original town site (the town's name was prefixed with "Lower" to avoid repetition with another place called "Peach Tree" in the state). This town was devastated by an F4 Tornado on March 21st, 1913, killing 27 people.

Geography

Notable people
James Crawford, former professional basketball player who played in the Australian National Basketball League
Brenda Lee Eager, soul singer and musical theatre performer. Grew up in Lower Peach Tree.

References

Unincorporated communities in Alabama
Unincorporated communities in Wilcox County, Alabama